Machinists Union Racing was a CART Indy Car team owned by the International Association of Machinists and Aerospace Workers and run by the IAM's national automotive coordinator Andy Kenopensky, a former appointee to the United States Metric Board. The team competed in CART from 1981 to 1990.

The team was the brainchild of IAM president William Winpisinger. It began sponsoring racing in 1978 by sponsoring a USAC Champ Car race at Trenton Speedway and sponsoring the Indy Car driven by Jerry Karl. The union formed its own team in 1981. From 1981 to 1988 it was additionally sponsored by Schaefer Beer alongside the Machinists Union branding. The team's most notable drivers during this time were Josele Garza who drove for the team from 1983 to 1987 and Roger Mears who drove for the team in 1982 and 1983. Garza finished 12th in the CART championship in 1985 and 11th in 1987. Garza brought the team its best CART finish of second at the Michigan 500 in 1986. Mears finished 9th in 1982 and 12th in 1983 and finished fourth at Riverside International Raceway in 1982. Scott Atchison and Kevin Cogan drove for the team in 1988 and saw little success, although Cogan did register the team's best finish of third at the Long Beach Grand Prix in 1988, finishing 13th in the 1988 championship while Atchison finished 20th. Veteran driver Pancho Carter joined the team with co-sponsorship from Hardee's and finished 13th and 20th in two seasons with the team with a best finish of 7th, coming in his first race for the team.

All team members were card-carrying members of the IAM. They had initially experimented with building their own chassis in 1980 but it was abandoned before it hit the track.

Throughout his involvement in the sport, team manager Andy Kenopensky was a constant critic of CART's management of the sport and complained that the racing was too expensive and that rules were being crafted to benefit large-budget teams at the expense of small-budget teams such as his own.

The union and Schaefer also sponsored a NASCAR Winston Cup entry for Joe Ruttman in the 1989 Daytona 500 fielded by CalCar Motorsports.

Drivers
 Scott Atchison (1988)
 Pancho Carter (1987, 1989–1990)
 Kevin Cogan (1988–1989)
 Larry Dickson (1981)
 Chip Ganassi (1985–1986)
 Josele Garza (1983–1987)
 Pete Halsmer (1985)
 Jerry Karl (1978)
 Rupert Keegan (1985)
 Peter Kuhn (1984)
 Jan Lammers (1986)
 Randy Lewis (1984)
 Roger Mears (1982–1983)
 Rick Miaskiewicz (1987)
 Mike Nish (1986)
 Johnny Parsons (1984, 1986)
 Scott Pruett (1988)
 Chip Robinson (1987)
 Tom Sneva (1987)
 Sammy Swindell (1987) (failed to qualify)
 Phil Threshie (1980)
 Rich Vogler (1988)
 Desiré Wilson (1986)

Complete Racing Results

PPG CART Indycar World Series
(key)

 Ran in conjunction with Mergard Racing.

References

American auto racing teams
Champ Car teams
International Association of Machinists and Aerospace Workers